Marty Essig (born 1 June 1975) is a Canadian sailor. He competed in the Laser event at the 2000 Summer Olympics.

References

External links
 

1975 births
Living people
Canadian male sailors (sport)
Olympic sailors of Canada
Sailors at the 2000 Summer Olympics – Laser
Sportspeople from Burlington, Ontario